The 1990–91 NBA season was the third season of the Miami Heat in the National Basketball Association (NBA). The Heat received the ninth pick in the 1990 NBA draft, and selected Willie Burton from the University of Minnesota. After a semi-promising 5–9 start, the Heat went on a ten-game losing streak, winning just 6 of 24 games in December and January. They lost 13 of their final 17 games finishing last place in the Atlantic Division with a 24–58 record, which was a slight improvement winning six more games than the previous season.

In his second year, point guard Sherman Douglas led the Heat in scoring with 18.5 points per game. He also led them with 8.5 assists per game. Second-year star Glen Rice, and last season's Most Improved Player Rony Seikaly also had solid seasons, and Burton was selected to the NBA All-Rookie Second Team. Following the season, Billy Thompson was released to free agency.

Draft picks

Roster

Regular season

Season standings

y – clinched division title
x – clinched playoff spot

z – clinched division title
y – clinched division title
x – clinched playoff spot

Record vs. opponents

Game log

Player statistics

Awards and records
 Willie Burton, NBA All-Rookie Team 2nd Team

Transactions

References

Miami Heat seasons
Miami Heat
Miami Heat
Miami Heat